Haveri Lok Sabha constituency is one of the 28 Lok Sabha (lower house of the Indian parliament) constituencies in Karnataka, a state in southern India. This constituency was created as part of the delimitation of the parliamentary constituencies in 2008. It first held elections in 2009 and its first member of parliament (MP) was Shivkumar Chanabasappa Udasi of the Bharatiya Janata Party (BJP). As of the latest elections in 2019, Udasi represents this constituency.

Assembly segments 
As of 2008, Haveri Lok Sabha constituency comprises the following eight Vidhan Sabha (legislative assembly) segments:

Haveri, Shirahatti, Hangal, Hirekerur, Byadgi, and Ranibennur Legislative Assembly segments were earlier in the former Dharwad South constituency.  Gadag and Ron Legislative Assembly segments were in the former Dharwad North and Bagalkot constituencies respectively.

Members of Parliament

Election results

General election 2019

General election 2014

General election 2009

See also 
 Dharwad North Lok Sabha constituency
 Dharwad South Lok Sabha constituency
 Haveri district
 List of Constituencies of the Lok Sabha

References

Lok Sabha constituencies in Karnataka
Haveri district